Mixed logit is a fully general statistical model for examining discrete choices. It overcomes three important limitations of the standard logit model by allowing for random taste variation across choosers, unrestricted substitution patterns across choices, and correlation in unobserved factors over time. Mixed logit can choose any distribution  for the random coefficients, unlike probit which is limited to the normal distribution. It has been shown that a mixed logit model can approximate to any degree of accuracy any true random utility model of discrete choice, given appropriate specification of variables and  the coefficient distribution.

Random taste variation

The standard logit model's "taste" coefficients, or 's, are fixed, which means the 's are the same for everyone. Mixed logit has different 's for each person (i.e., each decision maker.)

In the standard logit model, the utility of person  for alternative  is:

with

  ~ iid extreme value

For the mixed logit model, this specification is generalized by allowing  to be random. The utility of person  for alternative  in the mixed logit model is:

with

  ~ iid extreme value

This model is also called the random coefficient logit model since  is a random variable. It allows the slopes of utility (i.e., the marginal utility) to be random, which is an extension of the random effects model where only the intercept was stochastic.

The most widely used distribution is normal, mainly for its simplicity. For coefficients that take the same sign for all people, such as a price coefficient that is necessarily negative or the coefficient of a desirable attribute, distributions with support on only one side of zero, like the lognormal, are used.

Unrestricted substitution patterns

The mixed logit model can represent general substitution pattern because it does not exhibit logit's restrictive independence of irrelevant alternatives (IIA) property.

It can be seen from this formula that a ten-percent reduction for  need not imply (as with logit) a ten-percent reduction in each other alternative .

Correlation in unobserved factors over time

Standard logit does not take into account any unobserved factors that persist over time for a given decision maker. This can be a problem if you are using panel data, which represent repeated choices over time. By applying a standard logit model to panel data you are making the assumption that the unobserved factors that affect a person's choice are new every time the person makes the choice. That is a very unlikely assumption. To take into account both random taste variation and correlation in unobserved factors over time, the utility for respondent n for alternative i at time t is specified as follows:

where the subscript t is the time dimension. We still make the logit assumption which is that  is i.i.d extreme value. That means that  is independent over time, people, and alternatives.  is essentially just white noise. However, correlation over time and over alternatives arises from the common effect of the 's, which enter utility in each time period and each alternative.

To examine the correlation explicitly, assume that the βs are normally distributed with mean  and variance . Then the utility equation becomes:

and η is a draw from the standard normal density. Rearranging, the equation becomes:

By specifying the X's appropriately, one can obtain any pattern of covariance over time and alternatives.

since  is independent over time.

Simulation

Unfortunately there is no closed form for the integral that enters the choice probability, and so the researcher must simulate Pn. Fortunately for the researcher, simulating  Pn can be very simple. There are four basic steps to follow

1. Take a draw from the probability density function that you specified for the 'taste' coefficients.

2. Calculate . (The conditional probability.)

3.

4. Average the results

Then the formula for the simulation look like the following,

where R is the total number of draws taken from the distribution, and r is one draw.

Once this is done you will have a value for the probability of each alternative i for each respondent n.

See also 

Discrete choice

Further reading 
Ch. 6 of Discrete Choice Methods with Simulation, by Kenneth Train (Cambridge University Press)

References

Choice modelling